Swecon is a title annually awarded to a Swedish science fiction convention.

Since 1998, one Swedish science fiction convention per year has been elected to host national awards in science fiction and has been awarded the title "Swecon" in addition to its actual name. Swecon is usually the largest Swedish science fiction convention in any given year.

The name Swecon is part of a larger tradition and similar conventions are held in Norway, Denmark and Finland under the names Norcon, Dancon and Finncon.

List of Swecons

See also
List of science fiction conventions

References

External links
Swedish fandom – Swecon
Swecon 2020

Science fiction conventions in Europe
Swedish science fiction
sw
1998 establishments in Sweden